Mountain Gorilla is a 1992 documentary that shows the volcanic mountains in Rwanda, remnants of the mountain gorillas that live within it and the challenges they face.

The film was directed by Adrian Warren and produced by IMAX Corporation

References

External links 

 
  

1992 films
1992 documentary films
Documentary films about Rwanda
Documentary films about mammals
Documentary films about environmental issues
Gorillas
Films about gorillas
Films set in Rwanda